Onaka may refer to:
 Onaka (grape), a hybrid grape cultivar
 Onaka, South Dakota, United States
 Ōnaka Station, Gujō, Gifu Prefecture, Japan

People with the surname
 Alvin T. Onaka
 , Japanese footballer

Japanese-language surnames